HD 33203 is double star in the northern constellation of Auriga. It includes a bright giant star with a stellar classification of B2II. The two components have an angular separation of 1.617″ along a position angle of 222.1°.

References

External links
 HIC 24072
 Image HD 33203

Auriga (constellation)
Durchmusterung objects
033203
024072
Double stars
B-type bright giants